Gabriel Donev (born 29 June 1996) is a Bulgarian tennis player.

Donev has a career high ATP singles ranking of 782 achieved on 7 October 2019. He also has a career high ATP doubles ranking of 701 achieved on 18 July 2022.

Donev represents Bulgaria at the Davis Cup, where he has a W/L record of 0–2.

Challenger and Futures/World Tennis Tour Finals

Doubles: 9 (1–8)

National participation

Davis Cup (2 losses)
Gabriel Donev debuted for the Bulgaria Davis Cup team in 2019. Since then he has 2 nominations with 2 ties played, his singles W/L record is 0–1 and doubles W/L record is 0–1 (0–2 overall).

   indicates the result of the Davis Cup match followed by the score, date, place of event, the zonal classification and its phase, and the court surface.

References

External links
 
 
 

1996 births
Living people
Bulgarian male tennis players
21st-century Bulgarian people